Kharman Sukhteh (also Romanized as Kharman Sūkhteh; also known as Sukhta-Khirman and Sūkhteh Kharman) is a village in Eqbal-e Gharbi Rural District, in the Central District of Qazvin County, Qazvin Province, Iran. At the 2006 census, its population was 1,740, in 365 families.

References 

Populated places in Qazvin County